Pohořelice is a town in Brno-Country District in the South Moravian Region of the Czech Republic. It has about 5,300 inhabitants.

Administrative parts
Villages of Nová Ves and Smolín are administrative parts of Pohořelice.

Geography
It lies on the Jihlava River. It is situated in the Dyje–Svratka Valley. There are two large fish ponds in the municipal territory, Vrkoč and Starý. They are among the largest ponds in Moravia. The largest Moravian pond, Novoveský, is located near Nová Ves just across the municipal border.

History
The first written mention of Pohořelice is from 1222. It was a royal town until 1512, when it was acquired by Vilém II of Pernštejn. He and his descendants focused on the economic development of the town and they began to establish ponds. Pohořelice became a centre of grain growing, viticulture and fish farming.

In the 18th century, the Pohořelice estate was owned by the Dietrichstein family. The town experienced construction development, especially thanks to the construction of the road from Brno to Vienna in 1727.

After World War II there was an internment camp in the town for ethnic Germans, as a part of the Brno death march.

Demographics

Economy
Viticulture has a long tradition here. Pohořelice lies in the Mikulovská wine sub-region.

Sights

The landmark of Pohořelice is the Church of Saint James the Great. It is a three-nave Gothic church, which was gradually built from 1290 to 1580. Renaissance modifications were made in 1668.

A baroque monument is the Paar's Manor House in the centre of the town. it was built at the end of the 17th century. Today the building belongs to the school complex.

Leopoldsruhe is a Baroque hunting manor house, built for Leopold of Dietrichstein in 1747. It is an architecturally valuable monument.

Notable people
Eugen Beyer (1882–1940), Austrian field marshal
Věra Špinarová (1951–2017), singer

Twin towns – sister cities

Pohořelice is twinned with:
 Brezová pod Bradlom, Slovakia
 Poraj, Poland

Gallery

References

External links

 

Cities and towns in the Czech Republic
Populated places in Brno-Country District